The Peace Museum, Bradford is the only museum dedicated to the history and (often untold) stories of peace, peacemakers and peace movements, in the UK.
 
The Peace Museum aims to engage, inform and inspire through: items in its collection and exhibitions of learning and education activities for all sectors of the community, schools, colleges and universities, focusing on local, national and international people, events and stories posing questions about equality, diversity, cohesion, peace and non-violence
telling stories of peacemakers and peacemaking.

The museum asks visitors to consider peace and peacemaking as an active, as opposed to passive endeavour, a challenge and something that requires effort, asking "What could you do?" What story will you tell".

The initial idea of creating a peace museum arose in the mid-1980s from Gerald Drewett of the Give Peace a Chance Trust. In 1990 this was carried forward when Shireen Shah, an MA student at Bradford University’s Peace Studies Department, wrote a dissertation proposing a ‘Museum for Peace’. Two years on, the International Network of Museums for Peace held its first conference at the University of Bradford in 1992, during which it was proposed that a Peace Museum be established in Bradford. A committee was established to seek finance and general support for the idea. Initially called ‘The National Peace Museum Project’, the museum was established in 1994 through a five-year grant from the Joseph Rowntree Charitable Foundation and operated from a temporary site in Bradford in the Wool Exchange. In 1998 the museum moved to its present site on the top floor of 10 Piece Hall Yard, in Bradford city centre.

The museum has a varied temporary exhibition programme, hosting several exhibitions and displays throughout the year. Past exhibitions have ranged from 'Challenging the Fabric of Society' showcasing the protest banners that are part of its textile collection (until March 2017), 'Remembering the Kindertransport' to commemorate Holocaust Memorial Day (until April 2017) and 'A force for peace? The History of European Cooperation' (ended 2016) exploring the peace history behind the European Union.

References

Sources

External links

Tourist attractions in Bradford
Museums in Bradford
Peace museums
Museums established in 1994
1994 establishments in England